"Won't Back Down" is a song by American rapper Eminem, featuring American singer Pink. It is the fourth track on his seventh studio album Recovery (2010). The track features production from Aftermath Entertainment producer DJ Khalil, who helped write the song along with Eminem, Erik Alcock, and Columbus "Rahki" Smith.

Upon the release of Recovery, the song received generally positive reviews from music critics, who praised its aggressive nature and production. "Won't Back Down" charted at numbers 62, 65, 82, and 87 in the United States, Canada, the United Kingdom, and Australia respectively. It was used in the video game Call of Duty: Black Ops and its trailer as well as the trailers for the films Mission: Impossible – Ghost Protocol and Hitman: Agent 47. Eminem performed the song on Saturday Night Live and Late Night with Jimmy Fallon.

Background and composition
"Won't Back Down" was written by Eminem, DJ Khalil, Erik Alcock and Columbus "Rahki" Smith. Along with most of the songs from Recovery, "Won't Back Down" was recorded at 54 Sound and Effigy Studios in Ferndale, Michigan, with recording carried out by Mike Strange. The song is one of the few Eminem songs not in a 4:4 time signature, along with "Untitled" (also from Recovery) and "Underground" (from Relapse). Originally, the song was set to be a solo record, with Eminem singing the chorus himself. Later, Liz Rodriguez, who is also featured on Recoverys "25 to Life" and "Almost Famous", recorded the song's chorus. Eminem however,  explained in an interview that after recording his vocals for the song, he decided to include Pink on the song as he "felt like she would really smash this record." Rahki co-produced the song with Khalil.

On September 12, 2022, a lyric video for Won't Back Down was released on Eminem's YouTube channel.

Critical reception
Upon its release, "Won't Back Down" received generally positive reviews from most music critics. David Jeffries of Allmusic wrote positively of the song, describing it as a "lurching heavy metal monster" that "could be used as the lead-in to 'Lose Yourself' on any ego-boosting mixtape", but wrote more critically of the lyrics, denouncing the pop culture jokes featured throughout the song, particularly ones aimed at Michael J. Fox, calling the line "Make like Michael J. Fox in your drawers, playin' with an Etch-A-Sketch" "less effective" than other jokes aimed at him. Steve Jones of USA Today described it as "rock-tinged" and stated that Pink's appearance provides "outside star power".

Chart performance
"Won't Back Down" charted on four national charts worldwide due to digital sales on the release of Recovery. The song reached its highest position on the US Billboard Hot 100, where it peaked at number 62 on the chart for the week ending of July 10, 2010, although it fell off the chart the following week. The song also charted in Australia, Canada and the United Kingdom, peaking at number 87, 65 and 82 on their respective national charts, although on all three the song again only appeared for one week.

Appearances in media
A remixed version of the ESPN trailer of the video game Call of Duty: Black Ops featuring "Won't Back Down" was released on June 14, prior to the E3 Activision conference, for which he also performed. The song was also featured in the game's credits and zombie mode map "Five" as an easter egg. The official trailer for the 2011 action film, Mission: Impossible – Ghost Protocol, features "Won't Back Down". The song is also featured in TV spots for the 2015 movie Hitman: Agent 47.

Eminem has performed the song on live sketch comedy show Saturday Night Live accompanied by Lil Wayne and hypeman and D12 member Mr. Porter. Eminem wore a black jacket and a skull cap. Idolator reacted positively to Eminem's performance, stating that he proved "once again what a dynamic and energetic live performer he is on this exceptionally angry tune (even by Slim Shady standards)." He also performed the song on Late Night with Jimmy Fallon.

Credits and personnel
Recording
 Recorded at: Effigy Studios in Ferndale, Michigan.

Personnel
 Eminem – vocals, audio mixing and songwriting
 DJ Khalil – producer, additional keyboards and drum programming
 Mike Strange – recording and audio mixing
 Joe Strange – engineering assistant
 Eric Alcock – guitar
 Pink – vocals
 Rahki – keyboards and additional drum programming

Notes
 Credits and recording information from Recoverys booklet.

Charts

Certifications

References

Eminem songs
Pink (singer) songs
2010 songs
Songs written by Eminem
Song recordings produced by DJ Khalil
Songs written by DJ Khalil
Songs written by Erik Alcock